Men of Tomorrow is a 1932 British drama film directed by Zoltan Korda and Leontine Sagan, produced by Alexander Korda and written by Anthony Gibbs and Arthur Wimperis. It stars Maurice Braddell, Joan Gardner and Emlyn Williams and features Robert Donat's movie debut.

Plot
This is the story of an Oxford University student in the years after his graduation. Allen Shepherd (Braddell) has become a successful novelist and has married Jane Anderson (Gardner). A firm proponent of traditional sex roles, Shepherd leaves Jane when she accepts a teaching post at Oxford. He later changes his views, and the couple is reunited. Robert Donat and Merle Oberon were given top billing when Men of Tomorrow was distributed in the United States in 1935.

Cast
Maurice Braddell as Allan Shepherd
Joan Gardner as Jane Anderson
Emlyn Williams as  Horners
Robert Donat as Julian Angell
Merle Oberon as Ysobel d'Aunay
John Traynor as Mr. Waters
Esther Kiss as Maggie
Annie Esmond as Mrs. Oliphant
Charles Carson as Senior Proctor

Status
The film is currently missing from the BFI National Archive, and is listed as one of the British Film Institute's "75 Most Wanted" lost films.

References

External links
 BFI 75 Most Wanted entry, with extensive notes
 

1932 films
1932 drama films
British black-and-white films
Films directed by Zoltán Korda
London Films films
Lost British films
British drama films
Films produced by Alexander Korda
1932 lost films
Lost drama films
Films shot at Imperial Studios, Elstree
1930s English-language films
1930s British films
Films set in Oxford
Paramount Pictures films